Kazerun County is in Fars province, Iran. The capital of the county is the city of Kazerun. At the 2006 census, the county's population was 258,097, in 58,036 households. The following census in 2011 counted 254,704 people in 67,262 households. At the 2016 census, the county's population was 266,217 in 76,227 households. Chenar Shahijan District and Kuhmareh District were separated from Kazerun County in 2018 to form Kuhchenar County.

Administrative divisions

The population history and structural changes of Kazerun County's administrative divisions over three consecutive censuses are shown in the following table. The latest census shows six districts, 14 rural districts, and six cities.

Geographical location 
Kazerun city is bounded by Shiraz city from the east, Koh Chenar city from the north, Bushehr province from the west and south, and Farashband city from the southeast.

Universities and higher education centers 
In Kazerun, the two top universities in Kazerun are ranked based on reputation, research performance and alumni impact.

1. Salman Farsi University of Kazerun

2. Islamic Azad University, Kazerun

References

 

Counties of Fars Province